Brautaset is a surname. Notable people with the surname include:

Knut Brautaset (born 1939), Norwegian engineer
Tarald Brautaset (born 1946), Norwegian diplomat